The 1st Free French Division was one of the principal units of the Free French Forces (FFL) during World War II, renowned for having fought the Battle of Bir Hakeim.

Consisting of troops from mainland France and from the then French colonial empire, the division was formed by the first units to rally to de Gaulle after the fall of France. Together with the 3rd Algerian Infantry Division, it was the most decorated French division of the Second World War.

Creation and different nominations
 1940: Free French Expeditionary Corps. 
 1941: Free French Orient Brigade.
 May 1941: 1st Light Free French Division.
 20 August 1941: dissolution following the campaign of Syria.
 24 September 1941: regrouping of the Free French units of the Middle East into the 1st and 2nd Light Free French Divisions (divisions with two brigades each).
 December 1941: the 1st Light Free French Division, reworked into the 1st Free French Brigade Group to adapt itself to the British military organization, deploys to the Western Desert. 
 1942: regrouping of the two independent Free French brigades of the Moyent-Orient (Middle East) into the French Forces of the Western Desert, following the departure of the 2nd Independent Free French Brigade from the Levant on April.
 February 1943: recreated under the designation of 1st Free French Division - 1e DFL (division with three brigades 1re, 2e and 4e BFL).
 August 1943: renamed 1st Motorized Infantry Division (1re DMI), but continued to be called 1re DFL.
 15 August 1945: dissolution.

World War II

1940 

The 1re DFL officially formed on 1 February 1943 and was dissolved on 15 August 1945. However, for the veterans of this unit, the history of the division began in the summer of 1940.

In London, on 30 June 1940, amongst the troops that fought in Norway, 900 men of the 13th Demi-Brigade of Foreign Legion, commanded by Lieutenant-Colonel Raoul Magrin-Vernerey, and 60 Chasseurs Alpins made the choice to resume combat. Elements of a tank company, sappers, artillerymen and sailors chose the same: they would later constitute the 1er Régiment de Fusiliers Marins, 1er RFM.

In the Middle East, 350 men of a battalion stationed in Cyprus, led by Captain Jean Lorotte de Banes passed to British Egypt. With 120 men of Captain Raphaël Folliot, who left French Lebanon on 27 June, they formed the 1st Marine Infantry Battalion, 1er BIM. They were joined by legionnaires of the 6th Foreign Infantry Regiment (6e REI), sailors of the French Naval Squadron Force X, and a squadron of Moroccan Spahis of the 1st Spahi Regiment, commanded by Captain Paul Jourdier.

In Africa, part of the 31st battery of the 6th Marine Artillery Regiment, stationed at Bobo-Dioulasso, commanded by Captain Jean-Claude Laurent-Champrosay, passed from the French Upper Volta to the British Cameroons, forming the 1st Colonial Artillery Regiment (1er Régiment d'artillerie coloniale, 1er RAC).

Under the designation of Free French Expeditionary Corps, the troops formed in London disembarked at Freetown in Sierra Leone and participated in the unsuccessful Battle of Dakar, before being directed, in October 1940, to Douala in the French Cameroons. In November 1940, the unit participated in the Battle of Gabon, before going to Durban in South Africa.

1941 

Designated as the Free French Orient Brigade and commanded by Colonel Magrin-Vernerey, the brigade left Durban and disembarked at Suakin to take part in the East African Campaign. The brigade was reinforced by the Pacific Battalion and by troops of the French Equatorial Africa, the latter going from Brazzaville to Bangui, N'Djamena, before finally arriving at Khartoum and Suakin. The brigade participated in the Battle of Keren.
 
Under the designation of 1st Light Free French Division and under the command of General Paul Legentilhomme, the division joined the Syria–Lebanon Campaign in June 1941, where they fought against fellow Frenchmen, aligned with Vichy. The division entered into Damascus on 21 June 1941, then continued to Homs, Aleppo, Beirut and arrived at Cairo, where the division was dissolved.

The division is reconstituted under the form of two Free French brigades:
 The 1st Independent Free French Brigade, 1e BFL, commanded by General Koenig
 The 2nd Independent Free French Brigade, 2e BFL, commanded by General Cazaud
 A 3rd Independent Free French Brigade remained in French Lebanon and Syria until the end of the war to ensure the protection of these two countries.

1942 

The 1e BFL distinguished itself at the Battle of Bir Hakeim from 26 May – 11 June 1942, then in the Second Battle of El Alamein from October–November 1942.

The two brigades and the Free French Flying Column formed the  French Forces of the Western Desert, part of the British Eighth Army.

1943 
These two brigades (plus a third coming from Djibouti), are united on 1 February 1943 in the 1st Free French Division, 1re DFL, commanded by General Edgard de Larminat and participate in the Tunisian Campaign.

In June 1943, various troops of the Army of Africa joined the ranks of the division. Accordingly, the division was sent to the desert of Libya during two and a half months, at the request of Henri Giraud. The 2e DFL of General Leclerc would follow the same procedure.

After the reunification of the two French forces, on 1 August 1943, the division was officially designated as 1st Motorized Infantry Division due to its integration in the French Expeditionary Corps in Italy. In 1944, the 1st Motorized Infantry Division became the 1st Marching Infantry Division. Nevertheless, the unit remained known as the 1re DFL.

1944 

Commanded by General Diego Brosset and now part of the French Expeditionary Corps, the division participated in the Italian Campaign since April 1944.

With First Army, the division disembarked in Provence on 15 August 1944 and participated in the Battle of Toulon, then went up the Rhône after having sent a couple of reconnaissance squadrons to Montpellier. Lyon was reached on 3 September.

In autumn 1944, the French Forces of the Interior joined the First Army, replacing the 6000 Africans of the division in what was referred during that period as blanchiment (whitening).

General Brosset accidentally died on 20 November 1944 and was succeeded by General Pierre Garbay.

1945 

The division made its way to the Vosges where it faced Operation Nordwind, the last major German offensive on the Western Front. Afterwards it joined the battles for the Colmar Pocket. In March 1945, the division participated in the Battle of Authion. It then took Tende and La Brigue. When it was about to march on Turin the German Army in Italy surrendered on 2 May 1945.

Composition

Infantry

1re Brigade 
1st battalion of the 13th Demi-Brigade of Foreign Legion, 13e DBLE
2nd battalion of the 13th Demi-Brigade of Foreign Legion
 22nd North-African Marching Battalion

2e Brigade 
 Marching Battalion nº 4, BM 4
 Marching Battalion nº 5, BM 5 
 Marching Battalion nº 11, BM 11 (constituted in Syria in 1941)

4e Brigade 
 Marching Battalion nº 21, BM 21 (constituted in Djibouti in 1943) 
 Marching Battalion nº 24, BM 24 (same origin of BM 21)
 Marine Infantry and Pacific Battalion (grouping of the 1st Marine Infantry Battalion and the Pacific Battalion nº 1 following the Battle of Bir Hakeim).

Units disbanded before 1944 
 Marching Battalion nº 1, BM 1. With the 1e DFL, the battalion participated to the campaigns of Gabon, East Africa and Syria. The battalion then participated in the  Tunisian Campaign with the 2nd Armored Division before being disbanded 1943. 
 Marching Battalion nº 2, BM 2. Attached to the 3rd Independent Free French Brigade, in Syria, in July 1942, it was then sent to Madagascar and to the French Equatorial Africa.
 Marching Battalion nº 3, BM 3. Disbanded in 1942.

Other units 
 1er Régiment de Fusiliers Marins, 1er RFM
 1er Régiment de Marche de Spahis Marocains
 1st Tank company (then 501e Régiment de chars de combat in the 2e DB).
 11e Régiment de cuirassiers
 1st Artillery Regiment of Free French Forces, RAFFL
 21st anti-aircraft group of the Antilles
 1st Engineering Battalion 
 4th Anti-Tank company
 Headquarters Company  
 101st Auto Company
 1st Signals Battalion
 9th Maintenance Company 
 1st Traffic Detachment
 Military Police
 Division Logistics
 Hadfield-Spears Ambulance Unit
 Light Surgical Ambulance
 Naval Female Medical Evacuation Section

Decorations

The division was cited 4 times at the orders of the armed forces (26 June 1942, following the battle of Bir Hakeim; 27 January 1945, for Italy, the Vosges; 16 March 1945, for combats in Alsace; 7 July 1945, for the campaign of Authion) and the principal forming regiments were awarded the French Fourragere for 2 citations at the orders of the armed forces.

 Fourragere with olive colors of the Médaille militaire and Croix de Guerre 1939–1945 (4–5 citations at the orders of the armed forces) 
 13th Demi-Brigade of Foreign Legion 13e DBLE
 Marine Infantry and Pacific Battalion 
 1er Régiment de Fusiliers Marins 1e RFM
 Fourragere with olive colors of the Croix de Guerre 1939–1945 (2–3 citations at the orders of the armed forces)
 Marching Battalion 2
 Marching Battalion 5

Division Commanders 

 1941: Colonel Raoul Magrin-Vernerey
 15 April 1941 – 21 August 1941: General Paul Legentilhomme
 January 1943 – 16 May 1943: General Edgard de Larminat
 1943: General Marie-Pierre Kœnig
 1 August 1943: General Diego Brosset
 20 November 1944: General Pierre Garbay

Homages

Forty-eight cemeteries, are the resting places of the more than 3600 members of the division. Eight of the division's units were made Compagnons de la Libération. Four members of the division represent the combatants in uniform resting at the Mémorial de la France combattante at au Mont Valérien, Nous sommes ici pour témoigner devant l'Histoire que de 1939 à 1945 ses fils ont lutté pour que la France vive libre:

 Maboulkede (1921–1944) – Soldier of the 24th Marching Battalion, BM 24
 Georges Brière (1922–1944) – Sailor of the 1er Régiment de Fusiliers Marins, 1er RFM
 Marius Duport (1919–1944) – Sous-lieutenant of the 22nd North African Marching Battalion 22e BMNA
 Antonin Mourgues (1919–1942) – Caporal-chef au Marine Infantry and Pacific Battalion, BIMP

Casualties

The division endured the loss of 3619 killed in action (out of which 1126 Colonial Indigenous) with 67% killed in the period of April 1944 to May 1945.

See also 
Free France
Liberation of France
Order of Liberation
2nd Armored Division
Régiment de marche du Tchad

Sources & bibliography

 Jean de Lattre de Tassigny, Histoire de la première armée française, éd. Plon, 1949
Foreign Volunteers of the Allied Forces 1939–45. Nigel Thomas. London: Osprey Publishing, 1991.
GUF – Guerre 1939 – 1945. Les Grandes Unités Françaises (Volume V-2). Armée de Terre, Service Historique. Paris: Imprimerie Nationale, 1975.
La 1re D.F.L.. Boussard, Leon. Bobigny: L'Imprimerie de Bobigny (Seine), 1946.
The French Army 1939–45 (2). Ian Sumner. London: Osprey Publishing, 1998.
 FAQ (with some pictures) on the 1re D.F.L., a unit frequently eclipsed by the 2nd (Armoured) Free French Division.
Forum posting of TO&E of the predecessor elements of the 1re D.F.L, with reference to other FFL units in North Africa
 Annuaire de la 1re DFL, Collectif, 1972

References and footnotes

French World War II divisions
Free French Forces
French Foreign Legion
Military units and formations established in 1940
Military units and formations disestablished in 1945